Sharon Callahan (March 25, 1952 – April 30, 2015) was an American athlete. She competed in the women's high jump at the 1968 Summer Olympics.

References

External links
 

1952 births
2015 deaths
Athletes (track and field) at the 1968 Summer Olympics
American female high jumpers
Olympic track and field athletes of the United States
Place of birth missing
21st-century American women